Lord Ashdown can refer to:

Arnold Silverstone, Baron Ashdown (1911–1977)
Paddy Ashdown (1941–2018), Baron Ashdown of Norton-sub-Hamdon